Judas José Romo y Gamboa (7 January 1779 – 11 January 1855) was a Spanish prelate of the Catholic Church who served as Cardinal Archbishop of Seville.  Previously he had served as Bishop of Canarias in the Canary Islands.

Biography
He was born in Toledo, Spain to Brigadier Francisco Romo y Gamboa (1746–1813) and Ramona Fernández Manrique (1750–1787), and was educated at the University of Huesca. Details of his ordination to the priesthood are not known, however, he was selected as Bishop of Canarias by Pope Gregory XVI in 1833 and took up the role on 1 May 1834.
In September 1847 Pope Pius IX named him Archbishop of Seville an subsequently elevated him to Cardinal Priest on 30 September 1850.

He died on 11 January 1855 in Seville.

See also
 Roman Catholic Diocese of Canarias
 Roman Catholic Archdiocese of Seville

References

Spanish Roman Catholic bishops
Bishops appointed by Pope Gregory XVI
Cardinals created by Pope Pius IX
1779 births
1855 deaths